Seyyed Amer may refer to:
 Seyyed Amer, Dasht-e Azadegan